Hanna Ivy Laursen (born 19 May 1936) is a Danish diver. She competed at the 1956 Summer Olympics and the 1960 Summer Olympics.

References

External links
 
 

1936 births
Living people
Danish female divers
Olympic divers of Denmark
Divers at the 1956 Summer Olympics
Divers at the 1960 Summer Olympics
Divers from Copenhagen